Colegio Marista El Salvador is a private Catholic educational institution located in Manatí, Puerto Rico. The School is under the guidance of the Marist Brothers of the Province of Central America since its founding in 1967. 

The School has been operating in its current location since 1967.

References

External links
Official site

1967 establishments in Puerto Rico
Private_schools_in_Puerto_Rico
Manatí, Puerto Rico